Ray Erlenborn (January 21, 1915 – June 4, 2007) was an American vaudevillian actor and sound effects artist. He is also known to audiences as the voice of Rabbit from Winnie the Pooh Discovers the Seasons. Also did sound effects for Carol Burnett, Maude, Sonny and Cher and the original Dr. Dolittle animal sound effects.

Death
Erlenborn died at his home in West Hills, California at the age of 92 as a result of a bacterial infection.

Filmography
 Criminals Within  (1941)

References

American male voice actors
1915 births
2007 deaths
Vaudeville performers
Infectious disease deaths in California
Male actors from Denver
People from West Hills, Los Angeles